Borzykowa may refer to:

 Borzykowa, Łódź Voivodeship, Poland
 , a Roman Catholic council called by Henryk Kietlicz in 1210
 Borzykowa, Świętokrzyskie Voivodeship, Poland